Hugh Herland (c. 1330 – c. 1411) was a 14th-century medieval English carpenter. He was the chief carpenter to King Richard II.

One of his best known pieces is the hammer-beam roof at Westminster Hall, regarded as one of the greatest carpentry achievements of the time. He also worked for William of Wykeham at New College, Oxford, c.1384.

Herland was commissioned by royalty to work on some of the major architecture of the time, including Windsor Castle, Westminster Palace, the Tower of London and Rochester Castle, Portchester Castle and Winchester College Chapel, and he also contributed to the tombs of King Edward III and his Queen consort Philippa of Hainault in Westminster Abbey.

Gallery of work

References

1330 births
1411 deaths
English carpenters